Wichmann is a German surname.

Geographical distribution
As of 2014, 78.7% of all known bearers of the surname Wichmann were residents of Germany (frequency 1:3,983), 8.0% of the United States (1:177,345), 3.6% of Denmark (1:6,135), 3.5% of South Africa (1:59,575) and 1.3% of Brazil (1:631,210).

In Germany, the frequency of the surname was higher than national average (1:3,983) in the following states:
 1. Bremen (1:1,107)
 2. Lower Saxony (1:1,538)
 3. Schleswig-Holstein (1:1,639)
 4. Mecklenburg-Vorpommern (1:1,839)
 5. Hamburg (1:1,846)
 6. Brandenburg (1:2,088)
 7. Saxony-Anhalt (1:2,251)

In Denmark, the frequency of the surname was higher than national average (1:6,135) in the following regions:
 1. Capital Region of Denmark (1:4,202)
 2. Region Zealand (1:4,575)
 3. Region of Southern Denmark (1:5,388)

People
Achim Krause-Wichmann (1930–2000), German rower
Amalie Wichmann (born 1995), Danish handball player
C. E. A. Wichmann (1851–1927), German geologist and mineralogist
Clara Wichmann (1885–1922), German–Dutch lawyer, writer, anarcho-syndicalist, feminist and atheist
Cody Wichmann (born 1992), American football player
Erich Wichmann-Harbeck (born 1900), Chilean sailor
Eyvind Wichmann (1928–2019), US-American physicist
Friedrich-Wilhelm Wichmann (1901–1974), German sprinter
Hans Wichmann (1905–1981), German middle-distance runner
Hennig Wichmann (died 1402), one of the leaders of the German Likedeelers
Kanchi Wichmann (born 1974), British filmmaker
Kurt-Werner Wichmann (1949–1993), German serial killer responsible for the Göhrde Murders
Ludwig Wilhelm Wichmann (1788-1859), German sculptor
Mathias Wichmann (born 1991), Danish footballer
Moritz Ludwig George Wichmann (1821–1859), German astronomer
Rudolph Wichmann (1826-1900), German farmer, landowner and politician, member of Reichstag
Siegfried Wichmann (1921–2015), German art historian
Søren Wichmann (born 1964), Danish linguist
Tamás Wichmann (1948–2020), Hungarian sprint canoer

References

German-language surnames
Surnames of German origin